Deborah P. Britzman  is a professor and a practicing psychoanalyst at York University. Britzman's research connects psychoanalysis with contemporary pedagogy, teacher education, social inequality, problems of intolerance and historical crisis.

Early life and education

Britzman completed her undergraduate degree in teaching at the University of Massachusetts in Amherst. She then taught high school English for seven years. Britzman  completed a master's degree in Reading and Anthropology at the University of Massachusetts and earned her doctoral degree in ethnographic research in 1985.

Career
Britzman was hired as an assistant professor at Binghamton University. Seven years after she began teaching at Binghamton, she moved to Canada to teach at York University in Toronto, where she has been since 1992.

Britzman’s book Freud and Education, published in 2011 by Routledge Press explores key controversies of education through a Freudian approach. It defines how fundamental Freudian concepts such as the psychical apparatus, the drives, the unconscious, and the development of morality are related to the field of education.

In 2013 Britzman was working on a three-year research project titled "the emotional world of teaching: A psychoanalytic inquiry." The project is a study of the psychology of teaching and mental health. She was later named a Fellow of the Royal Society of Canada. Two years later, she was awarded the 2015 Hans W. Loewald Memorial Award from the International Forum for Psychoanalytic Education.

In 2016, she was the recipient of the Lifetime Achievement Award by the Canadian Association for Teacher Education. The next year, she was named a Tier 1 [York Research Chair]] in Pedagogy and Psycho-Social Transformations. She was also recognized by York as a University Research Leader.

Awards
Britzman was the first Faculty of Education member to be honoured with the title of York University Distinguished Research Professor. 
2017 Tier I York Research Chair in Pedagogy and Psycho-Social Transformations
2016 Canadian Association for Teacher Education Lifetime Achievement Award
2015 Hans W. Loewald Memorial Award
2009 Gary A. Olsen Award, presented by JAC- a journal of rhetoric, culture and politics
2007 Distinguished Psychoanalytic Educator’s Award
2006 York University Distinguished Research Professor
2003 James and Helen Meritt Distinguished Service Award to the Philosophy of Education from Northern Illinois University
1999 The Ontario Confederation of University Faculty Associations Teaching Award
1999 The Faculty of Graduate Studies Teaching Award, York University

Books
Britzman, D. P. (2021). Anticipating Education: Concepts for imagining pedagogy with psychoanalysis. Meyers Educational Press.

Britzman, D. P. (2016). Melanie Klein: Early Analysis, Play, and the question of freedom. Springer Press.

Britzman, D. P. (2011). Freud and Education. Routledge.
Britzman, D. P. (2009). The Very Thought of Education: Psychoanalysis and the impossible professions. SUNY Press
Britzman, D. P. (2006). Novel Education: Psychoanalytic Studies on learning and not learning. Peter Lang
Britzman, D. P. (2003). Practice Makes Practice: Revised edition. SUNY Press
Britzman, D. P. (2003). After-Education: Anna Freud, Melanie Klein, and psychoanalytic histories of learning. SUNY Press
Britzman, D. P. (1998). Lost subjects, contested objects: toward a psychoanalytic inquiry of learning. SUNY Press

References 

Richards, C. (2011). Young People, Popular Culture and Education. Continuum International Publishing Group. P. 39

External links
Deborah Britzman: Distinguished Research Professor, Psychoanalyst, York University: http://edu.yorku.ca/faculty/index.php?dept=&mid=5821

Year of birth missing (living people)
Living people
American psychoanalysts
Jewish psychoanalysts 
Academic staff of York University
University of Massachusetts Amherst College of Education alumni
Binghamton University faculty
Fellows of the Royal Society of Canada